Chamberlain is an English surname. In English, it means an attendant for a sovereign or lord in his bedchamber, or a chief officer in the household of a king or nobleman.

List of people
Notable people with this surname include:
Alec Chamberlain (born 1964), English football player
Azaria Chamberlain (1980) baby killed by dingo; mother and father wrongfully imprisoned for murder
Alexander Francis Chamberlain (1865–1914), Canadian anthropologist
Alex Oxlade-Chamberlain (born 1993), English football player  
Ardwight Chamberlain (born 1957), American voice actor and screenwriter
Austen Chamberlain (1863–1937), British politician, Nobel Peace Prize winner, son of Joseph Chamberlain
Basil Hall Chamberlain (1850–1935), British Japanologist and poet
Betsey Guppy Chamberlain (c. 1797–1886), textile mill worker of Native American background who wrote sketches and poetry in the early 19th century
Brenda Chamberlain (politician) (born 1952), Canadian politician
Brenda Chamberlain (artist) (1912–1971), Welsh artist and poet
Boeta Chamberlain (b. 1999), South African rugby union player
Calvin T. Chamberlain (1795–1878), New York politician
Charles Joseph Chamberlain (1863–1943), American botanist
Corinna Chamberlain, as also as Chan Ming-yan, Hong Kong-based Sinophone singer and actress with Australia-New Zealand ancestry
Cyril Chamberlain (1909–1974), British actor
Daniel Henry Chamberlain (1835–1907), American politician
Daniel R. Chamberlain, American academic administrator, president of Houghton College
David Chamberlain (born 1975), American cross-country skier
Dean Chamberlain, American photographer
Edward Chamberlain (disambiguation), multiple people
Emma Chamberlain, American Youtuber
George Chamberlain (disambiguation), several people
Helen Chamberlain (born 1967), British television host 
Henry Chamberlain (disambiguation), several people
Houston Stewart Chamberlain (1855–1927), British author noted for his works concerning the Aryan race
Howland Chamberlain (1911-1984), American actor
Ice Box Chamberlain (1867–1929), American baseball player
Jay Chamberlain (1925–2001), American race car driver
Jerry Chamberlain (born 1952), American singer/songwriter/guitarist/producer 
Joba Chamberlain (born 1985), American baseball player
John Chamberlain (letter writer) (1553–1628), English writer
John Angus Chamberlain (born 1927), American sculptor
John Curtis Chamberlain (1772–1834), US politician
John Henry Chamberlain (1831–1883), English architect
John Loomis Chamberlain (1858–1948), American army officer, recipient of the Distinguished Service Medal
John Marvin Chamberlain (1844–1928), English composer
John Rensselaer Chamberlain (1903–1995), American journalist and editor
Joseph Chamberlain (1836–1914), British politician
Joshua Chamberlain (1828–1914), college professor, officer in the United States Army during the American Civil War and Governor of Maine
Lauren Chamberlain (born 1993), American softball infielder
Lindy Chamberlain (born 1948) and Michael Chamberlain (1944–2017), whose infant daughter Azaria disappeared in the Dingo Baby case
Marise Chamberlain (born 1935), New Zealand middle-distance runner
Matt Chamberlain (born 1967), American drummer
M. E. Chamberlain (1932–2022), British historian
Mellen Chamberlain (1821–1900), American lawyer, historian and librarian
Montague Chamberlain (1844–1924), Canadian-American naturalist, founder of the American Ornithologists' Union
Nathan Henry Chamberlain (1830–1901), American clergyman
Neville Chamberlain (1869–1940), British Prime Minister from 1937 to 1940, son of Joseph Chamberlain
Neville Bowles Chamberlain (1820–1902), British Field Marshal
Neville Francis Fitzgerald Chamberlain (1856–1944), British Army officer and Inspector-General of the Royal Irish Constabulary
Neville Patrick Chamberlain (born 1960), English footballer
Neville Chamberlain (bishop) (1939–2018), British Anglican cleric, bishop of the Anglican Diocese of Brechin, 1997–2005
Owen Chamberlain (1920–2006), Nobel Prize–winning American physicist and co-discoverer of the anti-proton
Richard Chamberlain (born 1935), American actor who became a teen idol in the title role of the television show Dr. Kildare
Richard Chamberlain (MP for Islington West) (1840–1899), British politician
Samuel Chamberlain (1829–1908), American soldier, painter and artist
Samuel Selwyn Chamberlain (1851–1916), American journalist 
Siobhan Chamberlain (born 1983), English football goalkeeper
Spencer Chamberlain (born 1983), American vocalist for the band Underoath
Thomas Crowder Chamberlain (1843–1928), American geologist
Tosh Chamberlain (1934–2021), English footballer
Vicente Cuadra Chamberlain (1919–2000), Nicaraguan advertising executive 
Warren D. Chamberlain (1927–2013), American politician
William Charles Chamberlain (1818–1878), British Rear Admiral
William H. Chamberlain (1931–1972), American politician from Illinois
Wilt Chamberlain (1936–1999), American basketball player

References

See also 
 Chamberlayne (disambiguation)
 Chamberlin (disambiguation) 
 Chamberlaine 

English-language surnames
Occupational surnames
English-language occupational surnames